Elisabeth Schmid (1912–27 March 1994) was a German archaeologist and osteologist. She is best known for her work concerning the prehistoric statue, the lion-man, and for her book, Atlas of Animal Bones.

Early life and career

Schmid was born in Freiburg im Breisgau in 1912 and graduated with a phD from the University of Freiburg.

Over her career, Schmid published over 200 papers and two books. She began studying animal bones from Augusta Raurica in the 1950s and her analysis of those bones was the subject of her most well known book, Atlas of Animal Bones, which was published in 1972 and is still used worldwide today. In 1953 she established a laboratory at the University of Basel for prehistoric studies. In 1975-76 she became the first woman dean in the natural sciences faculty. 

In the 1980s, Schmid became involved with the prehistoric ivory sculpture, the Lion-man. It was first discovered in 1939 in a cave in southwestern Germany by Otto Völzing. Around 30% of the statue is missing and the gender is heavily disputed. German archaeologist, Joachim Hahn, interpreted part of the statue had male genitalia however Schmid later interpreted the same part of the statue as a pubic triangle. Further restoration of the statue began in autumn 1987 by Schmid and restorer, Ute Wolf.

Schmid died on 27 March 1994.

References

External links 
 Tierknochenatlas (digital edition)

1912 births
1994 deaths
Archaeologists from Baden-Württemberg
German women archaeologists
University of Freiburg alumni